Kenkō Satoshi (剣晃 敏志, 27 June 1967 – 10 March 1998) was a sumo wrestler from Osaka, Japan. His highest rank was komusubi.

Career
Debuting in November 1984, he reached the second highest jūryō division in March 1991. His first tournament in the top makuuchi division was in July 1992. Scoring only three wins there he fell back to jūryō, but reappeared in makuuchi in March 1993. He reached his highest rank of komusubi in May 1995. He fell back to maegashira 4 in July but turned in a strong 11-4 record, defeating yokozuna Akebono and returning to komusubi in September 1995. He also defeated yokozuna Takanohana in May 1996, the only wrestler to do so in that tournament.

In May 1997 Kenkō managed an 8-7 record at maegashira 11, but that was to be the last tournament in which he competed. He was hospitalised from July 1997, suffering from pancytopenia caused by an extremely rare form of leukemia (only four previous cases had ever been reported in Japan). His name remained on the ranking sheets, but unable to compete he had dropped to makushita 55 by March 1998. He died on 10 March, from a pulmonary embolism.

Fighting style
Kenkō  favoured techniques involving grabbing the opponent's mawashi, or yotsu-sumo. His favourite grip was hidari-yotsu, with his right hand outside and left hand inside his opponent's arms. His most common winning kimarite was yorikiri, a straightforward force out, followed by uwatenage (overarm throw) and yoritaoshi (force out and down).

Career record

See also
Glossary of sumo terms
List of past sumo wrestlers
List of komusubi

References

External links

1967 births
1998 deaths
Deaths from cancer in Japan
Deaths from leukemia
Japanese sumo wrestlers
People from Moriguchi, Osaka
Sumo people from Osaka Prefecture
Komusubi
Sumo wrestlers who died while active